OXF or Oxf may refer to:
 Oxford Airport (IATA code OXF) in the county of Oxfordshire, UK
 Oxford railway station (National Rail code OXF) in the county of Oxfordshire, UK
 Oxfordshire (Chapman code OXF), a county in the UK

See also